The 1979–80 Serie A season was the 46th season of the Serie A, the top level of ice hockey in Italy. Seven teams participated in the league, and HC Gherdeina won the championship.

First round

Final round

External links
 Season on hockeytime.net

1979–80 in Italian ice hockey
Serie A (ice hockey) seasons
Italy